Sintonia is a Brazilian crime teen drama streaming television series created and directed by Kondzilla that premiered on Netflix on August 9, 2019.

Narrated from the perspectives of the three characters Doni, Nando, and Rita who grew up together, the series follows the interconnectedness of music, drug trafficking and religion in a peripheral neighborhood of São Paulo.

The series links the first order of the criminal organization Primeiro Comando da Capital (PCC). The name of the faction is not mentioned, at least in the first season, but shows how it works in scenes, some criminals debating standing in a circle in an abandoned shed and showing that the criminals of the PCC will be called to avoid community conflicts.

Cast and characters

Main
 Christian Malheiros as Luiz Fernando "Nando" Silva
 Jottapê as Donizete "Doni" Santana da Costa
 Bruna Mascarenhas as Rita

Recurring
 MC M10 as Formiga
 Vinícius de Oliveira as Éder
 Rosana Maris as Jussara
 Danielle Olímpia as Cacau
 Julia Yamaguchi as Scheyla
 Leilah Moreno as MC Dondoka
 Júlio Silvério as Jaspion
 Jefferson Silvério as Rivaldinho
 Fabrício Araújo as Juninho
 Vanderlei Bernardino as Mr. Chico
 Fernanda Viacava as Sueli
 Felipe Vidal as Stephano
 Martha Meola as Lucrécia

Guest
 Dani Russo as herself
 MC Kekel as himself

Episodes

Series Overview

Season 1 (2019)

Season 2 (2021)

Season 3 (2022)

Production

Conception and development
The producer company Losbragas, who had already produced the comedy series Samantha! for Netflix, learned of Kondzilla's idea of making a short film about three young teenagers from the favela who wanted to buy expensive sneakers. After negotiations, the idea of the short film turned to a project of a series and the characters gained different goals and a more complex storyline.

Marketing 
On June 17, 2019, the teaser trailer for the series was released. The first full trailer was released by Netflix on July 11, 2019.

The red carpet premiere of Sintonia took place on July 30, 2019, at the Cinemateca Brasileira in São Paulo, where the first two episodes were previewed.

For the first time in an original production, Netflix released the first episode of Sintonia on YouTube as a promotion for the series. The episode became available from August 9, until August 11, 2019, at KondZilla's YouTube channel.

Soundtrack 
The music for the series was composed by Tropkillaz's electronic music duo of DJs Zegon and Lauds. The series also features original songs for the character MC Doni (performed by Jottapê) and produced by MC EZ. The soundtrack album was released to music streaming services such as Spotify, on August 17, 2019.

Season 1 songs
Funk da Netflix
Te Amo Sem Compromisso
Passei de Nave
Não Vai Ser Fácil (Taxado de Boy)
Tira Meu Nome da Boca

Reception
Joel Keller from Decider described Sintonia as a "fascinating look at life in São Paulo's favelas, where people are creative and hopeful, despite difficult circumstances."

References

External links

2010s Brazilian television series
2010s crime drama television series
2010s teen drama television series
2019 Brazilian television series debuts
Brazilian crime television series
Brazilian drama television series
Portuguese-language Netflix original programming
Television shows filmed in São Paulo (state)
Television shows set in São Paulo
Television series about organized crime
Television series about illegal drug trade
Television series about teenagers
Works about organized crime in Brazil
Primeiro Comando da Capital